The 2001 ASCAR season was the inaugural season of United Kingdom-based NASCAR style stock car racing, originally known as ASCAR.

Teams and drivers

Race calendar

The season had intended to run at Knockhill, Mondello Park and the EuroSpeedway as well as the Rockingham Motor Speedway but fuel pickup issues during the inaugural race in May caused that race to be discounted from the championship and the season was postponed and cut back to just five races at three meetings all at Rockingham.

Final points standings

External links
 

Stock car racing in the United Kingdom
ASCAR